John Guier Scott (December 26, 1819 – May 16, 1892) was a U.S. Representative from Missouri.

Born in Philadelphia, Pennsylvania, Scott completed preparatory studies.
He was graduated from Bethlehem Academy, Pennsylvania, in civil engineering.
He moved to Missouri in 1842.
He served as general manager of the Iron Mountain Co. at Iron Mountain.
He established the Irondale Iron Co. at Irondale in 1858.
He was an unsuccessful Democratic candidate for election in 1862 to the Thirty-eighth Congress.

Scott was subsequently elected as a Democrat to the Thirty-eighth Congress to fill the vacancy caused by the death of John W. Noell and served from December 7, 1863, to March 3, 1865.
He engaged in the drug business in St. Louis.

He resumed mining, and built furnaces, at Scotia, Missouri, in 1868 and at Nova Scotia a year later.
He returned in 1870 to St. Louis.
He moved to east Tennessee about 1880.

He died at Oliver Springs, Tennessee on May 16, 1892 and was interred at Bellefontaine Cemetery in St. Louis, Missouri.

References

External links 
 

1819 births
1892 deaths
Democratic Party members of the United States House of Representatives from Missouri
Politicians from Philadelphia
Burials at Bellefontaine Cemetery
19th-century American politicians